Vasil Chilingirov (born July 17, 1951) is a Bulgarian sprint canoer who competed in the early to mid-1970s. Competing in two Summer Olympics, he earned his best finish of seventh in the K-4 1000 m event at Montreal in 1976.

References
Sports-reference.com profile

1951 births
Bulgarian male canoeists
Canoeists at the 1972 Summer Olympics
Canoeists at the 1976 Summer Olympics
Living people
Olympic canoeists of Bulgaria